Nearly all of the 48 states of the United States of America plus its territories and the District of Columbia issued individual passenger license plates for the year 1954. The exception was Massachusetts, which issued renewal stickers for windshield display instead alongside 1953 registration plates.

Passenger baseplates

Non-passenger plates

See also

Antique vehicle registration
Electronic license plate
Motor vehicle registration
Vehicle license

References

External links

1954 in the United States
1954